Maggie Muggins was a Canadian children's radio and television series which began on-air live as a fifteen-minute program on CBC Radio on New Year's Day, 1947.  The highly popular radio program engaged children's imaginations, with its continuing cast of unique animal puppets and human characters. Maggie Muggins moved to CBC Television to air between September 29, 1955, and June 27, 1962.

Maggie Muggins is a freckle-faced girl in a gingham dress, with her red hair pulled back in two long pigtails who had adventures with many human-like animals and her neighbour Mr. McGarrity, who constantly worked on his garden.

The television series was adapted from previous media including radio and print.

External links 
 Queen's University Directory of CBC Television Series (Maggie Muggins archived listing link via archive.org)
 Maggie Muggins at the Canadian Communications Foundation
 
 Just Mary: the life of Mary Evelyn Grannan By Margaret Anne Hume (2006) ; on-line on Google Books.

1955 Canadian television series debuts
1962 Canadian television series endings
CBC Television original programming
1950s Canadian children's television series
Canadian television shows featuring puppetry
1960s Canadian children's television series
Black-and-white Canadian television shows